Rufus Cromwell Branch (July 21, 1890 – February 27, 1969) was an American planter and businessman. He played college football for the Tennessee Volunteers football team of the University of Tennessee as a quarterback. He was also a pitcher on the baseball team. He was credited with bringing John Barnhill to the University of Arkansas.

In 1910, Branch threw a 35-yard pass to W. C. Johnson in the loss to  Georgia. He was captain of the 1911 team.

Branch was also a World War I pilot.

Branch died at his home in Joiner, Arkansas known as the Black Cat Plantation.

References

1890 births
1969 deaths
People from Millington, Tennessee
American football quarterbacks
Tennessee Volunteers football players
People from Mississippi County, Arkansas
Tennessee Volunteers baseball players
Baseball pitchers